Trainspotting Live is a live television programme broadcast on BBC Four over three nights from 11 July 2016. It followed on from similar live programmes on the BBC such as Airport Live and Volcano Live.

Programme
The show was presented by Peter Snow, Hannah Fry, Dick Strawbridge and Tim Dunn from the Didcot Railway Centre in Didcot.  Trainspotting Live also featured pre-recorded reports and interviews as well as the real-time broadcast. Live cameras showed railway activity on the nearby Great Western Main Line.

During the broadcast, viewers were asked to send in footage of their recent spots, and were tasked with spotting a specific locomotive as well as a rare train, which was nicknamed "The Holy Grail of the Rail".

Episode list
Viewing figures from the Broadcasters' Audience Research Board (BARB).

Criticism and controversy
In the first episode, Peter Snow mistakenly said that a five-month-old video of Class 66s on delivery was live. This resulted in complaints from the general public and as a result the incident made the front pages of The Sun newspaper. A spokesman from the BBC said that the show had made a mistake in the “excitement of a live broadcast.”

In the second episode, Peter Snow mistakenly called an LNER Thompson/Peppercorn Class K1 No. 62005 an LMS Black Five. This has angered and annoyed many trainspotters but only got as far as that.

See also
Airport Live
The Tube
 The Railway: Keeping Britain On Track

References

External links
 

2016 British television series debuts
2016 British television series endings
BBC television documentaries
English-language television shows
Documentary television series about railway transport
History of rail transport in Great Britain
Rail transport hobbies